The Whitman River is an  river in Massachusetts that flows through Ashburnham, Westminster and Fitchburg. It arises from Lake Wampanoag in Ashburnham, travels through a couple of ponds in Westminster, and ultimately joins Phillips Brook in Fitchburg to form the North Nashua River.

See also 
 Rivers of Massachusetts
 Nashua River
 North Nashua River

References 
http://www.nashuariverwatershed.org/

Rivers of Massachusetts
Rivers of Worcester County, Massachusetts